Chakarov Peak is the rocky, partly ice-free peak rising to 883 m in Poibrene Heights on Oscar II Coast, Graham Land in Antarctica.  It is overlooking Punchbowl Glacier to the west.

The feature is named after Asen Chakarov, engineer in the first Bulgarian Antarctic campaign in 1987/88.

Location

Maps
 Antarctic Digital Database (ADD). Scale 1:250000 topographic map of Antarctica. Scientific Committee on Antarctic Research (SCAR), 1993–2016.

Notes

References
 Chakarov Peak. SCAR Composite Antarctic Gazetteer.
 Bulgarian Antarctic Gazetteer. Antarctic Place-names Commission. (details in Bulgarian, basic data in English)

External links
 Chakarov Peak. Copernix satellite image

Mountains of Graham Land
Oscar II Coast
Bulgaria and the Antarctic